Laser-blast or variation, may refer to:

 Laserblast, a 1978 U.S. science fiction film
 Laser Blast, a 1981 U.S, videogame by Activision for the Atari 2600
 Buzz Lightyear Laser Blast (aka Laser Blast), an amusement park ride
 a laser-blast, the blast of a laser
 the blast from a science fiction laser blaster gun
 the blast from a real-life laser-based directed energy weapon
 the ablative blast from the laser version of a sandblaster, in laser ablation

See also

 
 
 
 
 
 
 
 
 
 Laser (disambiguation)
 Blast (disambiguation)

Lasers